A military night or Prussian night refers to the custom of allowing complaints and the like no sooner than the following day in order to allow for a rethinking of the occasion overnight. 

References

Military law